Barry & the Tamerlanes were an American doo-wop trio from California. Their 1963 single for Valiant Records, "I Wonder What She's Doing Tonight", spent 10 weeks on the Billboard Hot 100, peaking at No. 21, while reaching No. 23 on Billboard's Hot R&B Singles chart. "Barry" was Barry De Vorzon, who went on to considerable success as a film music composer; the group's other members were Terry Smith and Bodie Chandler.

References

External links
Barry & The Tamerlanes at Doo Wop Heaven

Musical groups from California